Henry Bromage (17 May 1879 – June 1954) was an English footballer who played in the Football League for Derby County, Burton United and Leeds City, and in the Midland League for Doncaster Rovers.

References

1879 births
1954 deaths
Footballers from Derby
English footballers
Association football goalkeepers
Derby County F.C. players
Burton United F.C. players
Leeds City F.C. players
Doncaster Rovers F.C. players
Bentley Colliery F.C. players
English Football League players
Midland Football League players